Murray Godfred "Tiny" Francis (26 August 1907 – 2 August 1961) was a South African rugby union player, first-class cricketer and hockey player.

Rugby union career
Francis was born in Bloemfontein, South Africa and educated at Kingswood College in Grahamstown. He also represented Northern Province for the All Blacks tour of South Africa in 1928 and again against the British touring side of 1938. During the period 1932 to 1936, he spent in Cape Town, where he played club rugby for Gardens and Hamiltons.

Francis toured with the Springboks to Britain and Ireland in 1931. He was the understudy to the team captain, Bennie Osler and did not play in any test matches, but did play in 8 tour matches. He scored 18 points for the Springboks during the tour, which included 1 try, 4 conversions, 1 penalty goal and 1 drop goal.

Cricket career
Francis played first-class cricket for Orange Free State and Western Province. He played 29 first-class matches and scored 1747 runs at an average of 35.65, with a high score of 125. He also took 18 wickets with a best of 5/50.

See also
List of South Africa national rugby union players – Springbok no. 218

References

1907 births
1961 deaths
South African rugby union players
South Africa international rugby union players
Free State Cheetahs players
Free State cricketers
Western Province cricketers
Rugby union players from Bloemfontein
Rugby union fly-halves
Alumni of Kingswood College (South Africa)